Bande Utkala Janani (Salute to Mother Utkala) is a 2008 Indian Odia film directed by Suvendu Swain. The film deals with themes of patriotism and honesty towards profession.
That this is the first Odia film released through satellite using Digital UFO system.

Story
In this story a lady journalist holds the key to the story and due to her courage, risk taking and confidence the secret is revealed and the story moves. The police station is the family which is the center of all activities. Three police officers and the lady journalist are working together with a common goal to eradicate political corruption and goondagardi in the society.

Cast
Siddhanta Mahapatra
Sabyasachi Mishra
 Arpita Mukherjee
Minaketan
Hara Rath
Smitha Mohanty
Ashru Mochan Mohanty
Raicharan Das
Matru Prasad

Review
The irony of the situation is that the film's title itself suggests that it is a patriotic movie and it portrays three honest police officers fighting corruption. Some of the noted actors have been cast in the film and the producer and the director have left no stone unturned to show skin, much to the disgust of Oriyas. Bande Utkal Janani, was supposed to be a social, action-oriented drama. But it is a terrible movie. Even the songs are not good. The only exception in the film is Minaketan (the main villain). His portrayal of a corrupt politician who uses rustic language certainly deserves accolade.

Music 
In this movie the songs are composed by Sarat Nayak. The lyrics are by Bapu Goswami, Panchanana Nayak, and Bijaya Malla. Music arrangement by Nityashri Ranjan. To make it appealing to youth all songs have been done by keyboard sequencing. Abhijit Majumdar is the first composer after Late Sri Akshaya Mohanty to sing a song in a film for another music composer.

References

External links
 
 

2008 films
2000s Odia-language films